École Sir John Franklin High School is a high school in Yellowknife, Northwest Territories, Canada, operated by Yellowknife Education District No. 1. The school is named for the explorer Sir John Franklin.

Sir John Franklin (SJFHS) offers the French immersion program and a comprehensive fine arts program including music, drama and art.

On a regular day, the school follows a modified block schedule, consisting of Day 1 and Day 2. School is in session from 8:30 AM to 3:30 PM from Mondays through Fridays.

Facility
SJFHS first opened in 1958 as a new Federal School for the Northwest Territories. It underwent expansions in 1964, 1969, 1974 and a major renovation in 2003. The facility now comprises 9600m2 and includes a new town plaza with cafe, science wing, art gallery, gymnasium, and is co-located with the Northern Arts and Cultural Centre (NACC).  The Communications Arts Centre includes a television studio, edit suites, music room, and drama room. Career technology functions include a woodworking and aviation studio, the north’s only automotive shop, and computer-based business and tourism instruction.

In 2003 the school partnered with a private company to install a 2.0 kW (2,000 Watt) photovoltaic solar system on the school's roof.  The system is connected to the local utility grid.  One of the goals of the project was to educate the students and general population about the use of alternate energies in the North and serve an ongoing student-operated science project.

Notable alumni
Susan Aglukark, musician (attended the school but place of graduation not verified)
Michael Gilday, short track speed skater
Dustin Milligan, actor (90210, Schitt's Creek, Camp X)
Kevin Koe, world champion curler.
Tanya Tagaq, Inuit throat singer.
Nancy Karetak-Lindell, Canadian Member of Parliament.

See also
 List of schools in the Northwest Territories

References

External links
School's website
Sir John Franklin High School (Yellowknife, NT) fonds. Northwest Territories Archives

Education in Yellowknife
High schools in the Northwest Territories